Yoglav Crag (‘Yoglavski Kamak’ \'yo-glav-ski 'ka-m&k\) is the rocky peak rising to 861 m in the south extremity of Kondofrey Heights on Trinity Peninsula in Graham Land, Antarctica.  It is surmounting Znepole Ice Piedmont to the southeast.

The feature is named after the settlement of Yoglav in Northern Bulgaria.

Location
German-British mapping in 1996.

Maps
 Trinity Peninsula. Scale 1:250000 topographic map No. 5697. Institut für Angewandte Geodäsie and British Antarctic Survey, 1996.
 Antarctic Digital Database (ADD). Scale 1:250000 topographic map of Antarctica. Scientific Committee on Antarctic Research (SCAR). Since 1993, regularly updated.

Notes

References
 Yoglav Crag. SCAR Composite Antarctic Gazetteer
 Bulgarian Antarctic Gazetteer. Antarctic Place-names Commission. (details in Bulgarian, basic data in English)

External links
 Yoglav Crag. Copernix satellite image

Rock formations of the Trinity Peninsula
Bulgaria and the Antarctic